The Witches of Wenshar is a novel by Barbara Hambly published in 1987.

Plot summary
The Witches of Wenshar is a novel in which former mercenary Sun Wolf looks for magical training.

Reception
Dave Langford reviewed The Witches of Wenshar for White Dwarf #96, and stated that "It's easy to make a mystery when only the author knows precisely how this world's magic works; but Hambly issues enough clues for a Christie-like semblance of fairness, and the pages turn increasingly quickly."

Reviews
Review by Faren Miller (1987) in Locus, #317 June 1987
Review by Phyllis McDonald (1988) in Interzone, #23 Spring 1988

References

1987 novels